Aphnaeus marci is a butterfly in the family Lycaenidae. It is found in Cameroon.

Notes

References

Butterflies described in 2008
Aphnaeus